Rosenbach is a village in central Carinthia, Austria, an Ortsteil of Sankt Jakob im Rosental located a few kilometers southwest of the center of Sankt Jakob, and just northeast of the northern entrance to the Karawanken Tunnel. The Rosenbach railway station is the final Austrian station of the Rosental Railway (Rosentalbahn), connecting Sankt Veit an der Glan via Klagenfurt Central Station to the tunnel towards Slovenia, and it also has a connection to the Villach Central Station.

Gallery

References

Cities and towns in Villach-Land District